Still Swervin is the second studio album  by American rapper G Herbo. It was released on February 1, 2019, by Machine Entertainment Group, Cinematic Music Group, and 150 Dream Team. The album features guest appearances from Gunna, Juice Wrld, among others. The production was handled by Southside, Wheezy, DY, and more.

Track listing

Notes
 Track "Do Yo Shit" is stylized on all releases (both regular and censored) as "Do Yo Sh!t".

Personnel

Technical
 Slavic Livins– Mixing Engineer
 Chicago Audio Mastering - Mastering Engineer

Notes
  signifies an uncredited co-producer

Charts

References

2019 albums
G Herbo albums
Cinematic Music Group albums
Epic Records albums
Albums produced by Southside (record producer)
Albums produced by Cubeatz
Albums produced by Jake One